Ruckus is an American variety/game show that starred The Amazing Johnathan and was shot at Merv Griffin's Resorts in Atlantic City, New Jersey. Assistants on the program were Helen Incollingo and Charlene Donahue-Wallace. The format had audience members playing games for cash prizes. In the final round, three contestants played a four-minute stunt round.

The show often begin with Johnathan performing a magic trick, and the camera often zoomed in on the loud audiences cheering wildly for the contestants.

Stunts
The stunts were all similar to Beat the Clock stunts, but they were all designed to be messy. Sometimes Johnathan would perform another magic trick prior to the stunt. Many stunts often awarded around $500 to be split amongst the teams, and some stunts allowed for bonus money.

Reach For the Stars
The final round, titled "Reach For the Stars", involved 3 players trying to win as much money as possible. The four-minute timer began counting down as soon as Johnathan began reading the first question. The player who buzzed in and answered it earned $100 and ran over to a board with stars. He/she would grab a star and hand it to Johnathan to answer a question or perform a stunt, all of which were worth anywhere from $100 to $1,000. If they failed to answer a question or perform a stunt before hearing the buzzer, the other two contestants were eligible to answer a toss-up question to get in the game. Some episodes used a variation where another toss-up question would be asked after each stunt regardless of whether the contestant who played it completed it or not. The player with the biggest total won the game and the cash they earned with it when the four minutes expired.

Broadcast history
The show aired from September 9, 1991 to January 3, 1992 on WNBC-TV in New York City, with plans to move it to syndication. However, it did not resurface until the Game Show Network began airing reruns in 1997. According to the Amazing Johnathan's website, he was embroiled in a contract dispute with joint creator-executive producer Merv Griffin during the off-season and chose not to return; not wanting to continue the show with a different host, Griffin opted to cancel it instead.

References

External links
 

1991 American television series debuts
1992 American television series endings
1990s American game shows
Local game shows in the United States
Television series by Sony Pictures Television
Television series by Merv Griffin Enterprises
Television series created by Merv Griffin
Television shows set in New Jersey
Television shows filmed in New Jersey